Themis Adamantidis, born 28 September 1957) is a Greek singer and songwriter. He released around two dozen full-length studio albums, on Columbia Records, Minos Records/EMI and WEA, but also on smaller labels.

Discography

He released the following albums:
 1980 – Αγάπησέ με 
 1982 – Πονάμε όσοι αγαπάμε 
 1982 – Τα Βοριαδάκια (Συμμετοχή) 
 1983 – Δεν ήσουν ένα όνειρο 
 1984 – Μια αλήθεια 
 1986 – Δεν τελειώνουνε οι νύχτες 
 1987 – Ακόμα σ΄αγαπώ 
 1988 – 100% 
 1989 – Η Φαντασία μου 
 1991 – Επιμένω γιατί σ΄αγαπώ 
 1992 – Καλώς όρισες κοντά μου 
 1993 – Φίλοι 
 1995 – Ερωτική διαδρομή 
 1996 – Απόλυτος έρωτας 
 1998 – Χρυσές Επιτυχίες 
 1999 – Βαβέλ 
 1999 – Μα που να πάω 
 2000 – Αξέχαστες Επιτυχίες 
 2000 – Πού βρίσκεσαι 
 2002 – 18 Μεγάλες Επιτυχίες 
 2002 – 2 Lp-1 Cd 
 2002 – Συνήθης Ύποπτος 
 2003 – Ζεϊμπέκικα 
 2004 – Best Of 
 2004 – Σώμα με σώμα 
 2005 – Γεννήθηκα να σ΄αγαπώ 
 2005 – Ματωμένα χείλη 
 2005 – Ο Στέλιος του Σεπτέμβρη 
 2006 – Σε πρώτο πλάνο 
 2007 – Τσιφτετέλια & Συρτά 
 2008 – 36 Μεγάλες Επιτυχίες 
 2008 – Δώδεκα φεγγάρια 
 2009 – Στα 9/8 
 2009 – Το Λαικό τραγούδι 
 2010 – Μα που να πάω (3 Cd) 
 2010 – Καράβια τα όνειρα μου 
 2011 – Θέμης Αδαμαντίδης (4 Cd)

References

Living people
1957 births
20th-century Greek male singers
21st-century Greek male singers
Singers from Athens
Singers from Johannesburg